In the Roman Catholic Church a consistory is a formal meeting of the College of Cardinals called by the pope. There are two kinds of consistories, extraordinary and ordinary. An "extraordinary" consistory is held to allow the pope to consult with the entire membership of the College of Cardinals. An "ordinary" consistory is ceremonial in nature and attended by cardinals resident in Rome. For example, the pope elevates new cardinals to the College at a consistory; Pope Francis has called consistories for ceremonies of canonization.

A meeting of the College of Cardinals to elect a new pope is not a consistory, but a conclave.

History

Early popes conferred with their Roman presbytery which included the deacons appointed to oversee different parts of Rome. This tradition continued as deacons were replaced with cardinals and those cardinals (from among whom the pope was chosen) continued to meet at the request of successive popes.

Consistories became an opportunity for the pope to decide matters of state and dispense justice directly, with the support and advice of Roman bishops and those bishops from other regions who happened to be in Rome. Pope Leo IV ordered that consistories be held twice weekly. Pope John VIII relaxed that edict slightly and an order of twice-monthly consistories. With the Gregorian Reform, the Church limited outside influences on the papacy and the selection of popes and the power of cardinals increased. Tradition developed that the pope would use consistories (closer to twice-yearly by the 17th century) to reveal a list of those that were to be elevated to the rank of cardinal.

Eventually, responsibility for matters of justice was transferred to the Roman Rota and the functions of the Church were transferred to the Roman Curia reducing the need for regular consistories. Subsequently, consistories became primarily ceremonial in function.

Consistory for the creation of cardinals

At a consistory for the creation of cardinals, the pope creates new cardinals in the presence of a number, if not all, of the cardinals. Though the names of the new cardinals have been announced in advance, they only become cardinals at the consistory when the pope formally publishes the decree of elevation, even if the new cardinal is not present.

New cardinals present are presented with their rings, zucchetto (small skullcaps), and biretta (four-cornered silk hats) by the pope.

The zucchetto and the biretta are scarlet, the distinctive color of cardinals' vesture.

At the consistory new cardinals, with certain exceptions, are assigned titular churches in the Diocese of Rome.

Recent consistories
Pope Benedict XVI held five consistories. In 2007 and 2010 he held a day-long meeting with the entire College, the cardinals designate, and various advisers on the day preceding the Consistory of Creation.

Pope Francis followed this custom for his first two consistories. His 2014 consistory for creating new cardinals was preceded by an extraordinary consistory where Cardinal Walter Kasper gave an address designed to launch the discussions of the Synod on the Family held later in the year. In 2015 a similar extraordinary consistory on the eve of a consistory to create cardinals discussed the reform of the Roman Curia just a few days before Francis formed the Council of Cardinals to advise him on that reform. Francis has held seven consistories at roughly annual intervals, .

See also
 List of the creations of the cardinals
 In pectore, a way of creating a cardinal without public announcement

Notes

References

Additional sources
Guido Marini, "Modifications to the Rite Approved by Benedict XVI: A Consistory between Tradition and Innovation", Office for the Liturgical Celebrations of the Supreme Pontiff, Retrieved 31 August 2017

External links